A diamante poem, or diamond poem, is a style of poetry that is made up of seven lines. The text forms the shape of a diamond (◊). The form was developed by Iris Tiedt in A New Poetry Form: The Diamante (1969).

Description
A diamante poem is a poem that makes the shape of a diamond. The poem can be used in two ways, either comparing and contrasting two different subjects, or naming synonyms at the beginning of the poem and then antonyms for the second half for a subject.

In the poems, the subject is named in one word in the first line. The second line consists of two adjectives describing the subject, and the third line contains three verbs ending in the suffix ing which are related to the subject. A fourth line then has four nouns, again related to the subject, but only the first two words are related to the first subject. The other two words describe the opposite subject. The lines then are put in reverse, leading to and relating to either a second subject or a synonym for the first. Here is the order:
                               '''Noun
                        Adjective-Adjective
                          Verb-Verb-Verb
                       Noun-Noun-Noun-Noun
                          Verb-Verb-Verb
                        Adjective-Adjective
                               Noun 

Other forms or structure may also tend to have the middle line provide a phrase or description to the first line and seventh line:

Line 1: Beginning subject 

Line 2: Two describing words about line 1

Line 3: Three doing words about line 1 ending with ing

Line 4:  A short phrase about line 1,  A short phrase about line 7

Line 5: Three doing words about line 7

Line 6: Two describing words about line 7

Line 7: End subject

References

Graphic poetry